Marian Kozłowski may refer to:

 Marian Kozłowski (basketball) (1927–2004), Polish basketball administrator
 Marian Kozłowski (canoeist) (1915–1943), Polish sprint canoeist